David Roger Oldroyd (20 January 1936, Luton – 7 November 2014, Sydney) was an English-Australian historian of the geological sciences.

Biography
During WW II, he was sent, with many other children, to the safety of the Lake District. After studying sciences at Luton Grammar School, he entered in 1955 Emmanuel College, Cambridge, where he studied chemistry and geology and graduated in 1958 with a B.A. in Natural Sciences. In 1958 he became, in Harrow, London, a school teacher and, in a ceremony in Stroud, married Jane Dawes. He met her in the National Youth Orchestra — he played the cello and she played the oboe. While teaching, he began to attend evening classes to gain an M.Sc. in the history of science at University College London. In 1962 he and his wife emigrated from England to New Zealand, where he wrote Geology in New Zealand Prior to 1900 as his M.Sc. dissertation. He was examined, and passed postally, by Victor Eyles, and thus gained in 1967 his M.Sc. from University College London. In New Zealand, Oldroyd taught at two high schools, first at Hastings and then at Christchurch. In 1969 David and Jane Oldroyd moved to Australia, where he found employment teaching in the School of History and Philosophy of Science at the University of  New South Wales (UNSW). There he received a Ph.D. for his dissertation From Paracelsus to Haüy: The Development of Mineralogy in Relation to Chemistry. Eventually he became the head and professor of this school at UNSW, where he retired as professor emeritus in 1996.

As a science historian, he was a prolific author, who wrote several books and numerous essay reviews, book reviews, book chapters, and encyclopaedia articles. Many of his articles appeared in the journal Annals of Science. His best known book might be The Highlands controversy: constructing geological knowledge through fieldwork in nineteenth-century Britain.

Oldroyd served the International Commission on the History of Geological Sciences (INHIGEO) as Secretary-General from 1996 to 2004  and as vice-president of INHIGEO for Australasia and Oceania from 2004 to 2012. From 2008 to 2013 he was the editor-in-chief of the journal Earth Sciences History of the History of Earth Sciences Society (HESS), which is a member organization of the American Geosciences Institute (AGI).

Oldroyd was elected in 1994 a fellow of the Australian Academy of the Humanities. The International Academy of the History of Science elected him a corresponding member in 2002 and a full member in 2008. He received in 1994 the Sue Tyler Friedman Medal of the Geological Society of London, in 1999 the History of Geology Award of the Geological Society of America, and in 2001 a Centenary Medal from the Australian Government. His last award was the 2014 Tom Vallance Medal of the Geological Society of Australia — the medal was awarded in absentia because Oldroyd was dying from a brain tumour.

Selected publications

Articles
 
 
 
  (See Protogaea.)

Books

As editor
 
  (reprint of 1983 1st edition)

References

1936 births
2014 deaths
People from Luton
Historians of science
Alumni of Emmanuel College, Cambridge
Alumni of University College London
University of New South Wales alumni
Academic staff of the University of New South Wales
Recipients of the Centenary Medal